The women's 100 metre breaststroke event at the 1972 Olympic Games took place between September 1 and September 2. This swimming event used the breaststroke. Because an Olympic size swimming pool is 50 metres long, this race consisted of two lengths of the pool.

Medalists

Results

Heats
Heat 1

Heat 2

Heat 3

Heat 4

Heat 5

Semifinals

Final

Key: WR = World record

References

Women's breaststroke 100 metre
1972 in women's swimming
Women's events at the 1972 Summer Olympics